Enrique Arancibia Clavel (13 October 1944 – 28 April 2011) was a Chilean DINA security service agent who assassinated General Carlos Prats and his wife in 1974. General Prats, who had been commander-in-chief of the armed forces during the administration of Salvador Allende, had strongly criticized Pinochet's 1973 coup which deposed Allende; Prats went into voluntary exile in Argentina.
 
Aranciba was working for the government of Augusto Pinochet. He was convicted of the assassinations in Argentina. After serving 20 years in prison, Aranciba was paroled in July 2007. He was found stabbed to death in his apartment in Buenos Aires, Argentina in April 2011.

Background
Arancibia was associated with the right-wing group that killed Chilean Army Chief of Staff René Schneider in 1970 during a botched kidnapping. General Schneider had supported Allende's election by writing the Schneider Doctrine, which advocated an apolitical military. Aranciba was not directly linked with Schneider's death. After Schneider's murder, Arancibia left Chile and took up residence in unofficial exile in Buenos Aires, Argentina. In Argentina, Arancibia acted as a liaison between DINA and the Argentine secret police.

He became involved in the assassination of Prats and his wife, who went into exile in Argentina following Pinochet's coup. The assassination was part of Operation Condor, a campaign of political repression and terror involving intelligence operations and assassination of opponents, officially implemented in 1975 by the right-wing dictatorships of the Southern Cone of South America against left-wing rivals. Arancibia received assistance from Michael Townley in planning and carrying out the attack, which reportedly also involved Italian terrorist Stefano Delle Chiaie. The Italian ultimately testified against both Townley and Arancibia.

In 1978, shortly after the extradition of Townley to the United States for the murder of diplomat Orland Letelier in Washington, DC in 1976, Arancibia was arrested by Argentine intelligence officers and charged with espionage. He was convicted and sentenced to life for the 1974 assassination of General Prats in Buenos Aires; this sentence was upheld in an Argentine court in August 2004, the court thereby ruling that crimes against humanity do not have a statutory limit in Argentina, including those committed during the Dirty War.

Townley was also involved in General Prats' assassination, but never tried for the crime. (Townley served 62 months of a 10-year sentence for his role in the assassination of Orlando Letelier, Chilean Ambassador to the US, who was killed in Washington, D.C. in 1976. Townley's plea bargain for confessing to the Letelier assassination provided immunity from further prosecution, preventing his extradition to Argentina on charges relating to the Prats' assassination).

In addition, Arancibia was convicted and sentenced to 12 years in 2004 by an Argentine court for the kidnapping of Laura Elgueta and another Chilean woman in Buenos Aires. Elgueta was later charged with relaying communications for the ex–Minister of Defence Vivianne Blanlot. Although the Prats case was still open in Chile, Arancibia was freed under parole for technical reason in July 2007, after nearly 20 years of prison in Argentina.

Aranciba was found dead in Buenos Aires in April 2011. It was revealed posthumously that he was gay.

See also 
Eugenio Berríos

References 

1944 births
2011 deaths
Chilean anti-communists
Chilean assassins
Chilean kidnappers
Chilean people convicted of crimes against humanity
Chilean people imprisoned abroad
Chilean people murdered abroad
Chilean prisoners sentenced to life imprisonment
Deaths by stabbing in Argentina
Chilean gay men
People murdered in Argentina
People of the Dirección de Inteligencia Nacional
People paroled from life sentence
Prisoners sentenced to life imprisonment by Argentina
People convicted of kidnapping
20th-century Chilean LGBT people
21st-century Chilean LGBT people